The Clerics is a 2013 Indonesian drama film directed by Rako Prijanto. The film follows the Muslim cleric and founder of Indonesian Islamic organization Nahdlatul Ulama, Hasyim Asy'ari through the Japanese occupation of Indonesia and the Indonesian National Revolution. The film was selected as the Indonesian entry for the Best Foreign Language Film at the 86th Academy Awards, but it was not nominated.

Cast
 Ikranagara as Hasyim Asy'ari
 Christine Hakim as Nyai Kapu
 Adipati Koesmadji as Harun 
 Agus Kuncoro as Wahid Hasyim 
 Boy Permana as Karim Hasyim
 Dayat Simbaia as Yusuf Hasyim
 Bung Toni as Sutomo 
 Ahmad Zidan as young Abdurrahman Wahid 
 Imam Wibowo and Agung Wibowo as Sukarno 
 Tabah Helmi Nonaka as Lieutenant general Kumakichi Harada 
 Andrew Trigg as Aubertin Walter Sothern Mallaby

See also
 List of submissions to the 86th Academy Awards for Best Foreign Language Film
 List of Indonesian submissions for the Academy Award for Best Foreign Language Film

References

External links
 

2013 films
2013 drama films
2010s Indonesian-language films
Maya Award winners
Indonesian drama films
Films directed by Rako Prijanto